Freddie Robert John Coleman (born 15 December 1991 in Edinburgh) is a Scottish cricketer who played for Warwickshire County Cricket Club and Scotland. 

Coleman signed for Warwickshire in March 2013 after graduating from the county's Academy.  He was released in June 2016 at the end of his contract.

Coleman made his One Day International debut for Scotland against Kenya on 30 June 2013.

References

External links
 
 

1991 births
Living people
Scottish cricketers
Scotland One Day International cricketers
Scotland Twenty20 International cricketers
Warwickshire cricketers
Cricketers from Edinburgh
People educated at Strathallan School
Cricketers at the 2015 Cricket World Cup
Oxford MCCU cricketers